The 2017 Spa-Francorchamps GP3 Series round was the fifth round of the 2017 GP3 Series. It was held on 26 and 27 August 2017 at Circuit de Spa-Francorchamps in Stavelot, Belgium. The race supported the 2017 Belgian Grand Prix.

Classification

Qualifying

Feature race

Sprint race

Championship standings after the round

Drivers' Championship standings

Teams' Championship standings

 Note: Only the top five positions are included for both sets of standings.

References

|- style="text-align:center"
|width="35%"|Previous race:
|width="30%"|GP3 Series2017 season
|width="40%"|Next race:

Spa
GP3
GP3 Spa